Ray Cox (September 18, 1881 - November 7, 1957) was an early 20th century American actress and vaudeville performer.

Cox was born in Baton Rouge, Louisiana, attended South Division High School in Chicago, and went to Vassar College. Vaudeville performer Mabel Hite encouraged her stage aspirations, and Cox first appeared on stage in Peoria, Illinois in 1903.

She debuted in New York at Tony Pastor's Theatre on October 25, 1903. She became a headliner in vaudeville, with one popular sketch portraying an athletic girl at a baseball game, and which was made into an audio recording by Edison.

She was often billed as the "Southern girl" or "girl from Dixie". Her play roles including the part of Signora Monti in the popular 1914 play Twin Beds. She also appeared in Lew Fields's The Never Homes (1911), and The Charity Girl (1912).

Personal life
Cox's first husband was Henry Cox Fishel, whom she divorced for desertion in 1916. She married Harvey J. Flint, a manager at Goldwyn Pictures, in September 1917. Thereafter known as Ray Cox Flint, she died in Providence, Rhode Island on November 7, 1957, and was buried at Swan Point Cemetery.

References

External links

 
 
 Vaudeville sketch (audio recording) - The Baseball Girl (1909)
 Sketch on Matrimony by Cox, in One Thousand Laughs from Vaudeville (1908)

1881 births
1957 deaths
American stage actresses
Vaudeville performers
20th-century American actresses
Actresses from Baton Rouge, Louisiana
Vassar College alumni
Burials at Swan Point Cemetery
21st-century American politicians
21st-century American actresses